Edmondson may refer to:

 Edmondson (surname)
 Edmondson, Arkansas, United States, a town
 Edmondson, Baltimore, Maryland, United States, a neighborhood
 Edmondson station, a disused train station there
 Edmondson Park, New South Wales, Australia, a suburb of Sydney
 Edmondson railway ticket
 1761 Edmondson, asteroid

See also
 Edmonds (disambiguation)
 Edmundson (disambiguation)